Castellamonte is a comune (municipality) in the Metropolitan City of Turin in the Italian region Piedmont, located about  north of Turin.

It is located in the Canavese, at the feet of a hill surmounted by a 14th-century castle, hence the name (meaning "Castle at the Mount"). Only traces remain of the latter's original structure, what is visible now dating to an 18th-century renovation. The town is also home to an unfinished rotunda designed by Alessandro Antonelli, the Baroque church of San Rocco; the Sacro Monte di Belmonte is not far, though in the communal territory of Valperga.

Architects Carlo and Amedeo di Castellamonte were born in the town.

References

Canavese